Policing the Plains was a Canadian silent feature film directed by Arthur D. Kean. It was an historical docudrama about the Royal North-West Mounted Police, based on the R. G. MacBeth's, a Vancouver minister and historian, book of the same name.

Director A. D. Kean believed in the ideal of a Canadian film industry that would celebrate Canadian and British history, values, and institutions. He also intended the film as a corrective to the clichéd and inaccurate portrayal of the RNWMP and its members in the numerous "Mountie movies" that were churned out by Hollywood studios during the silent era. Through personal contacts, he was able to secure the co-operation of the RCMP, including the loan of uniforms and equipment. Assistant Commissioner T. A. Wroughton, of the RCMP's "E" Division, served as the film's technical advisor, and led a squad of Mounties shown in the opening scenes.

Plot
The film depicted episodes from the first fifty years of the force's existence, including: the Cypress Hills Massacre; the force's creation and March West; its relations with First Nations peoples on the prairies; the founding of Fort Macleod; the pursuit of whisky traders; the building of the Canadian Pacific Railway; the Canadian sojourn of Sitting Bull and his followers; the Klondike Gold Rush; and modern police methods in the 1920s.

Cast
The cast members were almost all non-professionals; many were recruited more for their ability to ride and handle horses convincingly, rather than for any noteworthy acting ability. Leading parts were played by Alfred Crump, Jack Downing [a.k.a. Jack Boyd], Joe Fleiger, Dorothy Fowler, James G. Harrison, Donald Hayes, Senior Heaton, Margaret Lougheed, Norman Randall, and Col. T. A. Wroughton. In addition, many members of the Blood First Nation appeared in crowd and camp scenes, wearing traditional dress and riding their own horses.

Production
In 1924, Arthur D. Kean purchased the rights to R. G. MacBeth's Policing the Plains for $5,000. He planned for a six-reel film with a budget of $40,000, but production difficulties increased the budget to over $125,000 as an eight-reel film. Kean was the screenwriter, producer, director, and cinematographer, and also handled publicity and some of the fund-raising. The film was in production for a prolonged period—nearly three and half years—and ran into a host of financial, logistical, and technical difficulties.

The film was shot almost entirely on location, at Green Lake, Vancouver and Victoria (British Columbia); Macleod, Standoff, Banff, and Buffalo National Park, near Wainwright (Alberta); Amulet (Saskatchewan); Lower Fort Garry (Manitoba); and Toronto (Ontario). Much of the outdoor action was filmed on the Blood Indian Reserve near Macleod. Interior scenes were later shot in Trenton, Ontario, at the studios of the Ontario Motion Picture Bureau.

Reception
The film was shown at the Royal Alexandra Theatre in Toronto, Ontario, from December 19 to 24, 1927. Kean was unable to secure further exhibition and distribution for the picture, and eventually it was lost. Leaving the film industry after the film's failure, Kean moved to the Toronto area, where he became a well-known journalist, broadcaster, photographer, and horse trainer. The film received mixed reviews. The Toronto Globe reviewer was enthusiastic, calling the film "a triumph for Canadian enterprise." The Daily Star praised its authenticity, but criticized its lack of "dramatic technique."

Preservation status
Policing the Plains is considered to be a lost film. In 1937, the negative was in an Ontario government film vault, but there is no evidence of its whereabouts since then. The A. D. Kean fonds (PR- 0755) at the BC Archives/Royal BC Museum includes more than a hundred production stills from the film, as well as some of the production paperwork.

References

Works cited
 

Canadian black-and-white films
Canadian documentary films
Lost Canadian films
Royal Canadian Mounted Police in fiction
1927 documentary films
1927 films
Documentary films about law enforcement in Canada
1920s Canadian films